Don Juan DeMarco is a 1995 American romantic comedy-drama film starring Johnny Depp as John Arnold DeMarco, a man who believes himself to be Don Juan, the greatest lover in the world. Clad in a cape and domino mask, DeMarco undergoes psychiatric treatment with Marlon Brando's character, Dr. Jack Mickler, to cure him of his apparent delusion. But the psychiatric sessions have an unexpected effect on the psychiatric staff, some of whom find themselves inspired by DeMarco's delusion; the most profoundly affected is Dr. Mickler himself, who rekindles the romance in his complacent marriage.

The movie is based on two different sources; the modern-day story is based on director/screenwriter Jeremy Leven's short story Don Juan DeMarco and the Centerfold (the movie's original title before the studio changed it shortly before release), while the flashbacks depicting DeMarco's back-story are based on the more familiar legend of Don Juan, especially as told by Lord Byron in his version of the legend.

Depp received the London Film Critics Circle Award for Actor of the Year, along with his performance in Ed Wood while the film's theme song, "Have You Ever Really Loved a Woman?", co-written and performed by Bryan Adams, was nominated for the Oscar, Grammy, and Golden Globe Award for Best Original Song.

Plot
John Arnold DeMarco is a 21-year-old man who dresses like Zorro, with a similar mask, hat and cape and claims to be Don Juan. After a passionate affair, he decides to commit suicide. At the site of the billboard he plans to jump off of, psychiatrist Jack Mickler dissuades him by posing as Don Octavio de Flores. John is then held for a ten-day review in a mental institution.

Mickler, who is about to retire, insists on doing the evaluation and conducts it without medicating the youth. Mickler listens to John's story continuing to pose as Don Octavio: Don Juan was born in Mexico, he has an affair with his school tutor which ultimately leads to the death of his father in a swordfight. Mickler listens to the story while spotting inconsistencies, such as the Castilian nature of John's accent, but continues to humor him.

At home, Mickler is living in a passionless marriage to his wife, Marilyn. As Mickler notices that John's presence at the institution is having an impact on the staff - both distracting the women and dancing with a male attendant on the lawn - he finds himself being influenced, and starts listening to opera in his house and rekindling the passion with his wife.

Eventually Mickler meets with John's grandmother, who tells him that John grew up in Phoenix, Arizona, and that his father died in a car crash. When Mickler returns to the institution and confronts his patient with this information, John dismisses his grandmother as misanthropic and of making the backstory up. In response Mickler recounts the story of an insecure young man who fell in love with a woman in a magazine, who then contacted her and was told she never wanted to speak to him again. When John asks what happened to the young man, Mickler tells him he tried to commit suicide.

As the ten days tick down, and pressure mounts on Mickler to support the youth's indefinite confinement, a decision which he is skeptical of. John has mentioned that his mother became a nun and remains in the convent to this day, and in a subsequent meeting with John, Mickler suggests that John's mother could have possibly had affairs, to which John responds with violent anger.

John concludes his story, about how he was kept two years in a harem as the lover of the sultaness, before finding true love and being rejected on a remote Greek island by his one true love, Doña Ana. Mickler tells him at the story's end that he believes John is Don Juan DeMarco, the greatest lover the world has ever known. When John asks Mickler who he is, he says "I am Don Octavio de Flores" and that John has seen through all of his masks.

At the end of the ten days, Mickler is able to convince John to take his medication, and makes him understand that not everyone believes he is Don Juan. Right before his retirement, Mickler and John meet with the board, with John in street clothes. He speaks with an American accent, and acknowledges that he was born in Queens, his father was killed in an accident, and that his mother was unfaithful to his father. John is released and accompanies Mickler, along with the doctor's wife, to the remote island that Don Juan has described where he met his true love.

Cast
 Marlon Brando as Dr. Jack Mickler/Don Octavio de Flores
 Johnny Depp as John Arnold DeMarco/Don Juan
 Faye Dunaway as Marilyn Mickler
 Rachel Ticotin as Doña Inez
 Bob Dishy as Dr. Paul Showalter
 Géraldine Pailhas as Doña Ana
 Talisa Soto as Doña Julia
 Marita Geraghty as Woman in Restaurant
 Richard C. Sarafian as Detective Sy Tobias
 Tresa Hughes as Grandma DeMarco
 Gilbert Lewis as Judge Ryland
 Franc Luz as Don Antonio
 Carmen Argenziano as Don Alfonzo
 Jo Champa as Sultana Gulbeyaz
 Stephen Singer as Dr. Bill Dunsmore
 Tom Mardirosian as Baba the Eunuch
 "Tiny" Lister Jr. as Rocco Compton
 Esther Scott as Nurse Alvira
Other notable appearances include Al Corley as the woman in the restaurant's date, Nick La Tour as the doorman Nicholas, and Bill Capizzi and Patricia Mauceri as characters in John's story, the sultan and Doña Querida. Selena also makes a brief appearance as a singer.

Music
The film features the original Bryan Adams song, "Have You Ever Really Loved a Woman?"; the lyrics incorporate quotes from Depp's character, and the melody is used as a musical motif throughout the film. In addition, the song itself is performed three times, once by Selena and a mariachi band serenading the characters in Spanish, once by Jose Hernandez and Nydia, as background music (again in Spanish), and once by Bryan Adams during the closing credits. The song is also available on the soundtrack. The song was nominated for an Oscar for Best Original Song at the 68th Academy Awards, but lost to" Colors of the Wind" from Pocahontas.

Selena recorded other songs for the soundtrack, including "El Toro Relajo". The score was composed, orchestrated, and conducted by Michael Kamen and was performed by the London Metropolitan Orchestra.

Tori Amos and Michael Stipe recorded a duet for the film called "It Might Hurt a Bit" but it remains unreleased.

Release

Box office 
A cut of the film was screened for investors in October 1994, before being released in April 1995.

The film had an estimated budget of $25 million, grossing just $22,150,451 in the U.S. With a total $68,592,731 gross worldwide, it was considered a success for New Line Cinema. Upon its opening weekend, Don Juan DeMarco opened at #4 with $4,556,274 behind the openings of Bad Boys and A Goofy Movie, and the second weekend of Tommy Boy.

Critical response
On Rotten Tomatoes the film has an approval rating of 72% based on reviews from 39 critics, with an average rating of 6.2/10. The site's consensus was "Don Juan DeMarco proves that a slight story can translate to entertaining cinema if it's acted out by a pair of well-matched professionals enjoying their craft." On Metacritic, the film has a score of 63 out of 100 based on reviews from 19 critics, indicating "generally favorable reviews". Audiences surveyed by CinemaScore gave the film a grade "A−" on scale of A+ to F.

Janet Maslin of The New York Times wrote: "It benefits not only from Mr. Brando's peculiar presence, but also from Johnny Depp, who again proves himself a brilliantly intuitive young actor with strong ties to the Brando legacy. The movie is cheesy, but its stars certainly are not." Roger Ebert of the Chicago Sun-Times gave the film 2 out of 4, and wrote "Brando doesn't so much walk through this movie as coast, in a gassy, self-indulgent performance no one else could have gotten away with."

See also

 The Brave, a film which Depp directed and in which he again acted alongside Brando

References

External links
 
 
 
Don Juan DeMarco at Rotten Tomatoes
 Movie stills

1995 films
1990s romantic comedy-drama films
American romantic comedy-drama films
American Zoetrope films
Films based on short fiction
Films set in psychiatric hospitals
Films based on the Don Juan legend
Films produced by Francis Ford Coppola
Films scored by Michael Kamen
New Line Cinema films
1995 directorial debut films
1995 comedy films
1995 drama films
1990s English-language films
1990s American films